Rebecca is a 1979 BBC Television drama, directed by Simon Langton. It is based on Daphne du Maurier's 1938 British novel Rebecca. Four 55-minute episodes were produced and aired on BBC 1.

Cast

Jeremy Brett as Maxim de Winter
Joanna David as The Second Mrs. de Winter
Anna Massey as Mrs. Danvers 
Hugh Morton as Frith
Richard Willis as Robert
Terrence Hardiman as Frank Crawley
Vivian Pickles as Beatrice
Leon Sinden as Giles
Julian Holloway as Jack Favell

Locations
Caerhays Castle doubled as Manderley in this series, The beach scenes were filmed at Porthluney Cove.

References

External links

1970s British drama television series
1970s British television miniseries
1979 British television series debuts
1979 British television series endings
Works based on Rebecca (novel)
BBC television dramas
English-language television shows
Television shows based on British novels
Television series set in the 1920s